Obelisk ships were ships used to transport obelisks.
Today, eight ancient Egyptian obelisks stand in Rome, though not in their original places. The first of the obelisks, the 263-ton Flaminian obelisk, was transported from Heliopolis – modern-day Cairo – in 10 BCE. while the last, the 500-ton Lateran obelisk, was transported from Karnak.

Ancient Egypt 
The earliest obelisk ships were built in Ancient Egypt to transport obelisks via the Nile from the quarries to their destination. 

During the reign of Thutmose I, Ineni was granted superintendence of the king's building projects, which included the erection of two obelisks. A surviving text fragment documents that the obelisk ship had a length of ~ and a width of ~.

A relief depicting Hatshepsut's barge loaded with two obelisks on its way to the great temple of Amun at Karnak was found in the Mortuary Temple of Hatshepsut at Deir el-Bahari.

In the 19th dynasty, Seti I commissioned numerous works, including multiple obelisks, and large barges to transport them. A rock stela at Aswan states:

Ancient Rome 
During the Roman Empire ships were constructed to transport obelisks from Egypt across the Mediterranean to Rome and Constantinople (modern Istanbul). Pliny the Elder (23–79 CE) and Ammianus Marcellinus (330–393 CE) give accounts of how obelisks were brought to Rome.

Loading of ships 
Pliny the Elder described how an obelisk was loaded onto a ship.

Destruction of ships 
There is little evidence of the great ships that carried the large obelisks across the Mediterranean. One of the two ships that carried the Vatican obelisk was purposely sunk by the emperor Claudius to build the Portus harbor; the other burned down during Caligula’s reign (36–41 CE) while on display at the Puteoli harbor.

Naval architecture 
Three Roman ships were built to transport one obelisk. The two aft ships were of rectangular shape; they were 37 meters in length and 5 meters in width. The two ships were held together by longitudinal beams, while the obelisk was tied to these longitudinal beams and held stationary underwater. The third ship, a larger trireme, was in the front and was tied to the two larger ships carrying the obelisk. The third ship’s purpose was to help steer the two aft ships and have rowers and sail power the ship across the Mediterranean.

Modernity

Cleopatra's Needles 
Until the second half of the 19th century two obelisks were located at the Caesareum of Alexandria, now known as Cleopatra's Needles. The fallen one was taken to London by the cyclinder ship Cleopatra in 1877. Four years later, the standing one was loaded onto the SS Dessoug and shipped to New York City.

See also
 List of obelisks in Rome

References

Bibliography 

 
 
 

 
 
 
 
 

Ancient Roman ships
Ancient Egyptian obelisks
Cargo ships